Tony McNamara (3 October 1929 – 30 May 2015) was an English footballer who played as a winger. He would become the first football player to play in all four divisions in England within the space of 12 months, as he played for Crewe Alexandra and then Bury.

Death
NcNamara died on 30 May 2015 after struggling with a long illness in Liverpool, aged 85.

References

1929 births
2015 deaths
Footballers from Liverpool
English footballers
Everton F.C. players
Liverpool F.C. players
Crewe Alexandra F.C. players
Bury F.C. players
English Football League players
Runcorn F.C. Halton players
Association football wingers